Khujutipara is a village in Nanoor CD block in Bolpur subdivision of Birbhum district.

Geography

Location

Note: The map alongside presents some of the notable locations in the area. All places marked in the map are linked in the larger full screen map.

Khujutipara is located in the south-eastern corner of the district which is an alluvial plain between Ajay River and Mayurakshi River. It has hot and dry summers, spread over March – May, followed by the monsoon from June to September. 78 per cent of the rainfall occurs during this period.

Demographics
As per the 2011 Census of India, Khujutipara had a total population of 2,595 of which 1,342 (52%) were males and 1,253 (48%) were females. Population below 6 years was 280. The total number of literates in Khujutipara was 1,760 (76.03% of the population over 6 years).

Transport
Khujutipara is on Nanoor-Khujutipara-Banspara Road.

Education
Chandidas Mahavidyalaya was established at Khujutipara in 1972. Affiliated with the University of Burdwan, it offers honours courses in Bengali, English, Sanskrit, history, geography, political science, mathematics and accountancy, and general courses in arts, science and commerce.

Healthcare
There is a primary health centre at Khujutipara (with 10 beds).

References

Villages in Birbhum district